Centrolobium is a Neotropical genus of flowering plants in the family Fabaceae, assigned to the informal monophyletic Pterocarpus clade of the Dalbergieae. The genus comprises mostly large trees to 30 m tall, characterised by an abundance of orange peltate glands that cover most parts of the plant, and fruits that are large winged samaras to 30 cm long with a spiny basal seed chamber.

Species
Centrolobium comprises the following species:
 Centrolobium microchaete (Mart. ex Benth.) H.C. Lima—canarywood, tarara amarilla

 Centrolobium ochroxylum Rudd

 Centrolobium paraense Tul.

 Centrolobium robustum (Vell.) Mart. ex Benth.
 Centrolobium sclerophyllum H.C. Lima
 Centrolobium tomentosum Guill. ex Benth.
 Centrolobium yavizanum Pittier—amarillo de Guayaquil

References

Dalbergieae
Fabaceae genera
Decorative fruits and seeds
Taxonomy articles created by Polbot